Miyazato (written 宮里) is a Japanese surname. Notable people with the surname include:

Ai Miyazato (born 1985), Japanese golfer
Eiichi Miyazato (1922–1999), Japanese karate coach and judoka
Kiyoshi Miyazato (born 1977), Japanese golfer
Mika Miyazato (born 1989), Japanese golfer
Yūsaku Miyazato (born 1980), Japanese golfer

Japanese-language surnames